The Afghan Ministry of Education() is responsible for policy formulation, the organization and supervision of education in Afghanistan. Its headquarters is located in Kabul. The current Education Minister is Rangina Hamidi. The Ministry of Education provides a semi-annual report to inform the public of advancements in Afghanistan's education sector.

Ministers

References

External links 
 

Education
Education in Afghanistan
Afghanistan